IHA may refer to:
Acronyms
Ice Hockey Australia, Ice Hockey Australia
Indonesia Handball Association, governing body of handball in Indonesia
Idiopathic hyperaldosteronism, an endocrinological disease
İhlas Haber Ajansı, the Turkish İhlas News Agency
Immaculate Heart Academy, Catholic high school in New Jersey
Imperial Household Agency, the Japanese government agency that oversees Royal affairs
Independence Hall Association
Indian Heart Association, non-profit dedicated to raising cardiovascular and stroke health awareness
Indirect Hemagglutination Test, A form of agglutination test that involves red blood cells
Ingeniørhøjskolen i Aarhus, the Engineering College of Aarhus, Denmark
Institute for Healthcare Advancement, a not-for-profit, private operating foundation providing health care and improving health literacy
Intel Hub Architecture, chipset and bus architecture for Intel Pentium 4, Intel, Pentium III-based systems
International Housewares Association, trade organization promoting sales and marketing of housewares, est. 1938
International Hydropower Association, a not-for-profit, international organization representing the hydropower sector, with a Central Office located in London, UK
Israel Handball Association, governing body of team handball in Israel

See also
Iha (disambiguation)